SM UC-96 was a German Type UC III minelaying submarine or U-boat in the German Imperial Navy during World War I.

Design
A German Type UC III submarine, UC-96 had a displacement of  when at the surface and  while submerged. The submarine was powered by two six-cylinder four-stroke diesel engines each producing  (a total of ), two electric motors producing , and two propeller shafts.

UC-96 was fitted with six  mine tubes, fourteen UC 200 mines, three  torpedo tubes (one on the stern and two on the bow), seven torpedoes, and one  SK L/45 or  Uk L/30 deck gun . Her complement was twenty-six crew members.

Construction and career
The U-boat was ordered on 12 January 1916 and was launched on 17 March 1918. She was commissioned into the German Imperial Navy on 25 September 1918 as SM UC-96. As with the rest of the completed UC III boats, UC-96 conducted no war patrols and sank no ships. She was surrendered on 24 November 1918 and broken up in Morecambe in 1919 – 20.

References

Notes

Citations

Bibliography

 
 

Ships built in Hamburg
German Type UC III submarines
U-boats commissioned in 1918
World War I submarines of Germany
World War I minelayers of Germany
1918 ships